Timothy Dann is a British voice-over artist, actor and writer. He is best known for his voice work on CITV, CBBC the comedy shows Hedz & OOglies. He also co-created and wrote OOglies with fellow writers Nick Hopkin & Austin Low. In 2009, he also provided the voice of the Total Intelligence Mechanism in the CBBC series Wait For It..!.

External links 
 BBC Press Release
 Official Website
 

British male voice actors
British writers
Living people
Year of birth missing (living people)
Place of birth missing (living people)